Addison N. Scurlock (June 19, 1883 – December 16, 1964) was an American photographer, founder of The Scurlock Studio, and businessman who became prominent in the early and mid-20th century for photographing Black Washington.

Early life
Addison Norton Scurlock was born in Fayetteville, North Carolina, on June 19, 1883. Businessman and Republican politician George C. Scurlock was his father. He had two siblings, including the biochemist Herbert Clay Scurlock. In 1900 after finishing high school, he moved to Washington, D.C. with his family. Scurlock began an apprenticeship with white photographer Moses P. Rice in order to pursue photography. He apprenticed from 1901 to 1904 before establishing himself as a photographer.

Scurlock Studio
The first Scurlock Studio opened in 1904 on S Street in Northwest D.C., which was his parents' home. In 1906, the family and studio moved to Florida Avenue. Two years later, they moved to 1202 T Street NW. In 1911, Addison opened a studio at 900 U Street NW. There he erected a display case, which was a popular attraction at the heart of Black Washington on Black Broadway.

Addison Scurlock's sons, George H. and Robert S. Scurlock, joined the business in the 1930s. The Scurlock Studio family business was operated by Robert until his death in 1994.

New Negro
The work of Addison N. Scurlock and the Scurlock Studio was affiliated with ideas about pride and progress of the New Negro. The location of the studio in Scurlock's home community and its location in Washington, D.C. facilitated this. The Black elite in Washington and everyday African Americans were aware of the power of both photography and capturing their image in positive ways. Scurlock, not only shot portraits, but also events such as church picnics, meetings, and high school graduations. The following is a brief list of the Scurlock Studio's notable subjects.

 Marian Anderson at the Lincoln Memorial
 Anna J. Cooper
 W. E. B. Du Bois
 Howard University
 Martin Luther King Jr.
 Mary Church Terrell and Robert Heberton Terrell
 Booker T. Washington
 Carter G. Woodson
Jessie De Priest
Madam C.J. Walker

Family 
Award-winning film director Hakeem Khaaliq is Scurlock's great-nephew.

References

External links
Scurlock Studio archive records, National Museum of American History, Smithsonian Institution
Portraits of a City: The Scurlock Photographic Studio's Legacy to Washington, D.C., National Museum of American History, Smithsonian Institution
 Haygood, Wil, "Smithsonian Showcases Black Washington as the Scurlock Photographers Saw It", The Washington Post, February 2, 2009.

African-American photographers
African-American history of Washington, D.C.
20th-century American photographers
1883 births
1964 deaths
People from Fayetteville, North Carolina
Photographers from North Carolina
Photographers from Washington, D.C.
20th-century African-American artists